The Local Court of the Northern Territory is one of two levels of court in the Northern Territory of Australia. There are local courts held in Darwin, Northern Territory, Alice Springs, Katherine, Tennant Creek, and some "bush courts" in remote locations.

History
The current court was established in 2016; however it is a continuation of the former Local Court and the Court of Summary Jurisdiction. The local court was first established under the Local Courts Ordinance 1941 (NT) and re-established in 1989 under the Local Court Act 1989 (NT). The Court of Summary Jurisdiction was established under the Justices Act (NT). All cases that were pending in the former courts  became proceedings in the newly established Local Court.

The magistrates court was the generic name given to the first tier in the Northern Territorian court system, usually constituted by a stipendiary magistrate. There was no actual magistrates court, and the reference to the court is usually a reference to the building. The Chief Magistrate, Deputy Chief Magistrates and other magistrates were appointed by the Administrator of the Northern Territory under the Magistrates Act (NT). Magistrates were called a stipendiary magistrate because they were paid a stipend or salary for performing their duties. The court could, in particular circumstances, also be constituted by one or two justices of the peace, however they were honorary appointments and they are not paid for their services.

Types of magistrates' courts
In addition to the Court of Summary Jurisdiction and the Local Court, the other courts constituted by a magistrate were :
 The Youth Justice Court, established by the Youth Justice Act (NT). It hears criminal charges against young offenders. A Youth is a person who was under the age of 18 at the time of being charged or appearing before the court
 The Community Court of the Northern Territory aimed to achieve community involvement in the sentencing process and to broaden the sentencing process.
 The Family Matters Court of the Northern Territory was established under the Community Welfare Act (NT).  It makes orders in respect of the welfare or guardianship of children considered to be in need of care.
 The Work Health Court of the Northern Territory which deals with workers' compensation claims.
 The Alcohol Court of the Northern Territory dealt with alcohol dependency that leads to crime to reduce the incidence of crime, help to rehabilitate offenders, and improve health and social amenity.
 The Coroners Court of the Northern Territory, appointed under the Coroners Act (NT) to hold inquests into deaths.

Community courts

Some community participation had occurred in sentencing of Aboriginal offenders in some circuit courts the 1970s, but it was not until 1995 that the practice was enshrined in law. In April 2005 the first Community Court was introduced in Darwin, principally, but not exclusively for Aboriginal offenders. Three circuit courts, including on the Tiwi Islands and at Nhulunbuy, were established. Community courts involve local community members, and focus public accountability of the offender to the victim.

However community courts were abolished under the Howard government's "Intervention" strategy, first in 2011 for adults, and then the youth courts in 2012. There have been calls to reinstate the courts, in order to reduce the high rates of Indigenous incarceration, and of recidivism among offenders. Jesuit Social Services welcomed the introduction of the 2021 Aboriginal Justice Agreement as a first step, and supported proposals to establish 20 Community Courts across the territory. The new agreement (the Northern Territory Aboriginal Justice Agreement) includes commitments to:
Develop and establish Community Courts in consultation with Aboriginal communities, members of the judiciary and other relevant legal entities;
Ensure pre-sentencing reports are prepared for all Aboriginal offenders before a Community Court to identify the behaviours and causes of their offending to assist in their rehabilitation; and
Provide Community Courts with improved sentencing options.

Jurisdiction

Civil jurisdiction
The Local Court has jurisdiction to deal with civil claims for damages, debt and equitable relief if the amount sought is less than $250,000. The only exception is claims that are less than $25,000 that can be heard by the Northern Territory Civil and Administrative Tribunal (NTCAT). The parties to the claim can agree to have larger amounts determined by the Court. Cases are commenced by way of a statement of claim alleging the nature of the claim.  The court encourages parties to complete their claims in plain English using non-technical language wherever possible.  However some claims may need to be properly formulated with legal terminology. A person can defend the statement of claim by lodging a written defence.  The defence essentially answers the allegations made by the plaintiff and may allege any facts in support of the defence. Additionally, the defendant may counter-claim against the plaintiff if there is a claim. After a defence is filed, the registrar of the court fixes a conciliation conference to which the parties are required to attend.  Parties can explore settlement or the matter can be listed for hearing. Cases are heard by a local Court judge.

Criminal jurisdiction

The court has jurisdiction to deal with less serious offences, called summary offences, for which the penalty is a fine or 2 years or less in prison. These are heard by a local court judge who decides if the accused is guilty or not guilty and if they are guilty imposes a penalty. In 2016/17 the Local Court dealt with 13,447 cases, including 2,172 cases in the Youth Justice Court, 4,436 domestic violence cases and 494 care and protection cases, .

The court is also the first stage of dealing with serious offences, in which the judge decides if there is enough evidence for the person to be tried in the Supreme Court, typically by a jury.

The court also deals with other preliminary matters such as whether a person should be released on bail.

Other jurisdiction
The court also has the power to grant adoptions and to determine appeals against decisions of certain statutory office holders or bodies, such as appeals from the decisions of the Commissioner of Tenancies.

Appeals
In certain circumstances, an appeal on a question of law may be made to the Supreme Court of the Northern Territory.

Judges
Darwin

Alice Springs

Circuit courts
Judges are allocated to travel to all parts of the territory to hear cases. Judges based in Darwin are allocated to the Northern and Katherine circuits while judges based in Alice Springs are allocated to the Southern circuit. In remote circuit courts, known as "bush courts",  many Aboriginal court practices are used on an informal basis; community views and relevant cultural information are provided to the courts.

Northern Circuit Courts

Katherine Circuit Courts

Southern Circuit Courts

Footnotes

References

Sources
Local Court Act 2015 (NT) 
Local Court Rules (NT)

External links

Local courts on nt.gov.au

Northern Territory courts and tribunals